The West Bend Company was a West Bend, Wisconsin, company from 1911 to 2001.  The West Bend Company manufactured aluminum cookware and electrical appliances, but also made two-stroke cycle engines, including outboard boat motors.  Art Ingels used a surplus West Bend engine to power the first kart.  Clayton Jacobson II used a West Bend 2-stroke motor to power the first stand-up Jet Ski. The engine division of West Bend was sold to Chrysler, then to Brunswick, and finally to US Motor Power.

In 2001, Regal Ware, Inc. of Kewaskum, Wisconsin, acquired certain assets of the West Bend Company.  In 2003, Regal Ware sold the Small Kitchen Appliance Division of the West Bend Company to Focus Products Group LLC.  The Small Kitchen Appliance Division is now known as West Bend Housewares.

Regal Ware retained the West Bend Cookware Division and product lines of the West Bend Company; and continues to manufacture the cookware products in West Bend and Kewaskum, Wisconsin, under the brand names Lifetime and Royal Queen.  This represents more than 100 years of continuous manufacture of West Bend Cookware product lines in West Bend, Wisconsin.

External links
Archived Records of the Company
Detailed History of the West Bend Company

Manufacturing companies established in 1911
Defunct companies based in Wisconsin
Manufacturing companies disestablished in 2003
Marine engine manufacturers
Home appliance brands
Kitchenware brands
1911 establishments in Wisconsin
2003 disestablishments in Wisconsin
Engine manufacturers of the United States